DreamSTATE is a Canadian ambient music project known for their soundscape installations and early live ambient performances in the Toronto, Ontario area. Their soundscapes combine electronic music processes with field recordings and range from light to dark ambient and drone music.

History
dreamSTATE was founded in 1995 by Toronto electronic musician Scott M2 (Scott McGregor Moore) who was soon joined by Jamie Todd (aka URM). Their first ambient installation, "waveforms" (1996), was mounted in the H5 holographic gallery in Toronto where it played continuously for 6 months. dreamSTATE's first CD release, "BETWEEN REALITIES" (1998), was a one-hour excerpt from that installation. They began performing their soundscapes live in 1997 and have continued to be active electronic music performers. In 2000 dreamSTATE began curating THE AMBiENT PiNG, a weekly live ambient performance event in Toronto providing a stage for developing artists in the genre and hosting notable touring performers such as Robert Rich, Sara Ayers, Alpha Wave Movement, Erik Wollo, Tom Heasley, James Johnson and Vir Unis. In 2004 they performed in the Huron Historic Gaol in Goderich, Ontario at the opening of the "Bread & Water" multi-media installation, which played for 3 months in the gaol. Their soundscapes from that installation (inspired by the book "Moon Sea Crossing" by poet Lynn Harrigan) were released as the CD "PASSAGE" in 2005. In 2006 dreamSTATE's concert CD "OM" was released, recorded live at the OM Festival 2000 in Tweed, Ontario.

Discography

Albums
 BETWEEN REALITIES - (1998 e-SPACE)
 PASSAGE - limited Bread & Water edition - (2004 e-SPACE)
 PASSAGE - (2005 e-SPACE)
 OM - (2006 e-SPACE)
 a decade dreaming - (2010 e-SPACE)
 The North Shore - w/ Heiki - (2012 paper+sound)
 DRoNE DAY - (2017 e-SPACE)
 Stone Shore - w/ Heiki - (2017 paper+sound)
 EPHEMERAL DRoNE - (2018 e-SPACE)

Compilation tracks
 "White Winter Moon" from ambient.01@hyperreal - (2000 aquaFM)
 "Alpha Waves" from Ambient Landscapes 2 - (2000 Dark Duck)
 "The Stonecrest Visitation" from Infinity Paradox - (2000 Fusion Audio)
 "The Storm Within" w/ cheryl o from ambient.02@hyperreal - (2002 aquaFM)
 "Adrift In The City" from Harmony with Ambience - (2003 Windfarm)
 "Twilight Impressions" w/ James Johnson & Wally Jericho from Linger - (2003 AtmoWorks)
 "Flying Air nia" w/ Steven Sauve from Local Flavour 2003 - (2003 Get Real)
 "Sunspot Interference" from PiNG AMBiENCE 1 - (2003 Arcolepsy)
 "Molten" from Fluidities - (2004 Foundry)
 "Phases of the Moon" w/ Susanna Hood from PiNG AMBiENCE 2 - (2004 APT)
 "As It Happens" w/ Lynn Harrigan from Deep Wireless 1 - (2004 NAISA)
 "Clearing" from PiNG AMBiENCE 3 - (2005 APT)
 "Fogbound" from Foglands - (2007 Umbra)
 "Deeper" from The Other Side of the Sky - (2007 Umbra)
 "Ghost Nebula" from Sounds of a Universe Overheard - (2007 Hypnos)
 "Lost Expedition" w/ Heiki from Quiet Drones 4 - (2012 paper+sound)
 "Laurentide" w/ Heiki from Quiet Drones 5 - (2013 paper+sound)
 "Ephemeral City Twilight" from Quiet Drones 6 - (2015 paper+sound)
 "White Falcon" from Legacy and Evolution - (2015 RadHausUS)
 "Nimbostratus" w/ Heiki from Quiet Drones 7 - (2015 paper+sound)
 "Summer's Drone" from Quiet Drones 10 - (2019 paper+sound)
 "Six Mile Drone" from Drone Alone - (2020 Leucrocuta)

URM
 Synthphonics 1 - Darkness on the Edge of Light - (2002 APT)
 Synthphonics 2 - Hush on the Peace Terrain - (2002 APT)
 SADU LiVE - (2006 Sylken)

See also 
List of ambient music artists

External links / References
Official dreamSTATE website
dreamSTATE Interview 2000
dreamSTATE Interview 2005
dreamSTATE at Discogs
dreamSTATE Interview re THE AMBiENT PiNG
THE AMBiENT PiNG website

Canadian ambient music groups
Canadian electronic music groups
Musical groups from Toronto
Musical groups established in 1995
1995 establishments in Ontario